The 2022 USA Marathon Championships were held in Sacramento, California organized by USA Track and Field, Sacramento Running Association at California International Marathon. It served as the national championships in marathon for the United States. The results of the event contribute to determined Team USA for the 2023 World Athletics Championships.

Results

Men

Women

References

External links
Official Results
Official Website

California International Marathon
California International Marathon
California International Marathon
California International Marathon
USA Outdoor Track and Field Championships
USA Marathon Championships